Fang Yuting (born 21 December 1989) is a Chinese archer. At the 2012 Summer Olympics she competed for her country in the women's team event, winning a silver medal. China beat Italy by one point in the first round, then the US, followed by Russia, again by one point, before losing to South Korea by one point in the final. In the individual event, she lost in the first elimination round to Ika Rochmawati.

See also 
 China at the 2012 Summer Olympics

References

External links
 
 

Chinese female archers
Living people
1989 births
Olympic archers of China
Archers at the 2012 Summer Olympics
Olympic silver medalists for China
Olympic medalists in archery
Sportspeople from Liaoning
People from Tieling
Medalists at the 2012 Summer Olympics
21st-century Chinese women